The 1998 Liverpool Victoria UK Championship was a  professional ranking snooker tournament that took place at the Bournemouth International Centre in Bournemouth, England. The event started on 16 November 1998 and the televised stages were shown on BBC between 21 and 29 November 1998.

This was the first UK championship to be held in Bournemouth since the inaugural championship in 1977, after 20 years at Preston. The Conference Centre has held snooker competitions before. It hosted the World Cup between 1985 and 1990, the Mercantile Credit Classic in 1991 and 1992,  the International Open in 1994 and 1995, and the Grand Prix in 1996 and 1997.

Ronnie O'Sullivan was the defending champion, but he withdrew before the tournament. His doctor had told him to rest after suffering from physical and nervous exhaustion.

John Higgins won this year's title by defeating Matthew Stevens 10–6 in the final to go with the World Championship crown he won earlier in the year. This was Higgins' 10th ranking title.

Tournament summary

Defending champion Ronnie O'Sullivan was the number 1 seed with World Champion John Higgins seeded 2. The remaining places were allocated to players based on the world rankings.

Prize fund
The breakdown of prize money for this year is shown below: 

Winner: £75,000
Runner-up: £39,000
Semi-final: £19,750
Quarter-final: £10,080
Last 16: £5,525
Last 32: £3,450
Last 64: £2,950
Last 96: £1,460
Last 134: £235

Stage one highest break: £1,500
Stage two highest break: £5,000
Total: £460,000

Main draw

Final

Century breaks

All Rounds 

 141, 116, 107, 106, 101  John Higgins
 138, 128, 127, 125, 109  Gary Ponting
 138  Dominic Dale
 138  Joe Grech
 136, 134, 119  Gerard Greene
 135, 117, 105  Matthew Stevens
 130, 127  Fergal O'Brien
 128  Barry Pinches
 126  Jimmy White
 118, 111, 104  Andy Hicks
 118  Michael Holt
 116  Mark Williams

 115, 105, 100  Dave Harold
 115  Chris Small
 114  Patrick Wallace
 113  Anthony Hamilton
 111  Martin Clark
 110  Leo Fernandez
 107, 105  Euan Henderson
 107  Alfie Burden
 104, 102, 101  Lee Richardson
 102  Peter Ebdon
 100  Adrian Gunnell

References

UK Championship (snooker)
UK Championship
UK Championship
UK Championship